When We Make Love may refer to:

 "When We Make Love" (Alabama song)
 "When We Make Love" (Ginuwine song)